Hildebrand is a surname, and may refer to:

Adolf von Hildebrand (1847–1921), German sculptor
Alice von Hildebrand (1923–2022), Belgian philosopher and theologian
Billy Hildebrand (1924–1992), American football player and coach
Brian Hildebrand (1962–1999), American wrestling manager
Brianna Hildebrand (born 1996), American actress
Bror Emil Hildebrand (1806–1884) Swedish archaeologist, numismatist and museum director
Bruno Hildebrand (1812–1878), German economist
Dan Hildebrand, American actor
David K. Hildebrand, scholar on American music history
Dietrich von Hildebrand (1889–1977), German Catholic philosopher and theologian
Francis B. Hildebrand (1915–2002), American mathematician
 (1835–1915), German botanist
George Hildebrand (1878–1960), American baseball player
Gerhard Hildebrand (1877–unknown), German journalist and politician
Gert Hildebrand (born 1953), German car designer
Grant Hildebrand, American architect and architectural historian
Hans Hildebrand (1824–1913) Swedish archaeologist
Henry Hildebrand (1911–2006), Canadian religious educator
Hilde Hildebrand (1897–1976), German actress
Ike Hildebrand (1927–2006), Canadian ice hockey and lacrosse player
J. B. Hildebrand, American football coach
Jeffery Hildebrand, American businessman
Joe Hildebrand (born 1976), Australian journalist
Joel Henry Hildebrand (1881–1983), American educator and pioneer chemist
Johann Hildebrand (1614–1684), German composer, organist, and poet
J. R. Hildebrand, American race car driver
Josef Hildebrand (1895–unknown), Czech fencer
Jürgen Hildebrand (born 1948), German handball player 
Klaus Hildebrand (born 1941), German historian
Lloyd Hildebrand (1870–1924), British racing cyclist 
Louis Hildebrand, French cyclist
Madison Hildebrand (born 1980), American realtor and media personality
Martín von Hildebrand (born 1943), American-Colombian ethnologist
Nadine Hildebrand (born 1987), German track and field athlete 
Oral Hildebrand (1907–1977), American baseball player
Palmer Hildebrand (1884–1960), American baseball player
Peter E. Hildebrand, American agricultural economist
Philipp Hildebrand (born 1963), Swiss banker
Ray Hildebrand (born 1940), member of the American duo Paul & Paula
Rudolf Hildebrand (1824–1894), German scholar
Samuel F. Hildebrand (1883–1949), American ichthyologist
Sara Hildebrand (born 1979), American platform diver
Timo Hildebrand (born 1979), German football player

See also
Hildebrand (disambiguation)
Hildebrandt (disambiguation)

German-language surnames
Swedish-language surnames
Jewish surnames
Surnames from given names
Russian Mennonite surnames